Ponmundam  is a census town in the Malappuram district of Kerala state in India. The Malappuram-Tirur state highway passes through this area. This was a part of the Kingdom of Tanur (Vettathunad) in medieval times.

History
The name "Ponmundam" was given by Mamburam Thangal, who had a strong relationship with the village. He married a girl from the Neduvanchery Family called Ayesha. Her tomb is inscribed 'Ayesha Malabaria Ponmundam',  who was the sister of chief commander of the "Cheroor Pada", Mr. Saidalavi Neduvanchery. Folklore relates that at the time most people in the village were poor until Thangal told foretold that this village would become a "Ponmundum"  meaning  'Land OF Riches'.

Landmarks
Ponmundam Mahallu Juma Masjid is situated near the state highway road, Now VTS Hashim Thangal is the kazi of Ponmundam, while his late father VTS kunju Thangal and VTS Thangal (Cheruthu Thangal) was a great leader for Ponmundam, he was Khatib of Ponmundam, he was the ruler of ponmundam mahllu, was the president SYS tanur mnadalam committee, and Kazhi family in 500 years old in Ponmundam, Main educational institutions are Ponmundam Higher Secondary School and some private institutes. Ponmundam Islamic Centre leads a main role in its social activities. Currently, most of the natives are working in Gulf regions, mainly Al Ain and other parts of UAE.99.99% leads bachelor life in gulf regions as they are low-salaried. Main agricultural products are coconut, areca and betel leaf. Arecanut and betel leaves are exporting to North India & Pakistan through nearest local markets like Thalakkadathur and Pan Bazar(Tirur) respectively via rail and road.  Before 15 years this area had a lot of paddy fields, later it is land filled for housing purpose more over nowadays agriculture is a failed business.

Sports Clubs
This area can boast the presence of three noted football clubs namely YOUTHWING arts and sports club ponmundam, parammal PRC and OSP which played a vital role in the sports history of this locality.  
This village has a moderate educational background, most of the natives high school completed, but women education is still in its primitive state.
Kasa Kulangara is also an important sports club that's from Kulangara near to Ponmundam.
Kulangara is a wonderful place to visit for its traditional culture, History, Sports and its agriculture.
Kulangara is also famous for its ponds that is already in its name ( "Kulam" in Malayalam means pond ).

Printing Industry
In the horizon of Arabic printing media, especially for Arabic Colleges and Islamic publications. This village have given a great contribution through  & Al Aman Kitab Bhavan based on 'Al Huda Bookstall' Calicut and Al Jalal from Tirur. Palace Hotel near Tirur Railway Station is a nostalgic memory of old railway travellers, which also hails from this village.

Politically, this village support left and right parties depending on current situations and some time it shows some religious cult bias also.  Any how, for Legislative and Parliament elections it support mainly Indian Union Muslim League.

And moreover, all these Ponmundam is led by Kazi family. Now VTS Hashim Thangal is the Kazi of Ponmundam, And his late father VTS kunju Thangal and VTS Thangal (Cheruthu Thangal) was a great leader for ponmundam, he was khatib of ponmundam juma masjid and died on 26/3/2009

Demographics
 India census, Ponmundam had a population of 23173 with 10967 males and 12206 females.

Transportation
Ponmundam village connects to other parts of India through Tirur town.  National highway No.66 passes through Tirur and the northern stretch connects to Goa and Mumbai.  The southern stretch connects to Cochin and Trivandrum.   Highway No.966 goes to Palakkad and Coimbatore.   The nearest airport is at Kozhikode.  The nearest major railway station is at Tirur.

References

Cities and towns in Malappuram district
Tirur area